Zelný trh (English: Vegetable Market or Cabbage Market) is a square and traditional marketplace in Brno, Czech Republic.

The square
In the middle of the square is the Parnas Fountain, a large Baroque fountain created in 1690–1695. Other landmarks of the square are Dietrichstein Palace from the early 17th century, which is the seat of the Moravské zemské muzeum (Moravian Museum), and the building of the Reduta Theatre from 1608, which is the oldest theatre building in Central Europe. Under the square is an underground labyrinth of passages and cellars from the Middle Ages.

The market
Zelný trh has been in use since 1190, earlier than the city was established. Originally, it was a general market. Later, it specialised in vegetables and fruits. Since 1255, it was known by the Latin forum superius and a century later by 1340, it was called Krautmarkt – Zelný trh. It has operated for 850 years in one place and for 700 years under the name Zelný trh. It was never interrupted, continuing through the communist time when all other private shopping was completely destroyed.

The market is the largest in Brno and the oldest continuously operating market with vegetables and plants in Central Europe. The market contains many shops that sell vegetables, fruit, meat (now rabbits only and smoked), fish (in Christmas time only), flowers, plants, seeds, seedlings, breads (bakery products), Moravian kolach, spices, nuts, eggs, cheese, and Moravian traditional spices and herbs items. The market also has many small restaurants and street-food stalls.

Gallery

See also
Moravian cuisine
Franz von Dietrichstein

Further reading
 STEHLÍK, Miloš. Kašna Parnas od Johanna Bernharda Fischera z Erlachu. Brno: Památkový ústav v Brně, 1996. 47 pages. .
 SAPÁK Jan, Zelný trh, Facebook 2020

References

Brno
Fountains in Europe
Street culture
Food markets